Babai, also Babaeus, was Catholicos of Seleucia-Ctesiphon and Patriarch of the Church of the East from 497 to 503. Under his leadership, the Church in Sasanian Empire (Persia) became increasingly aligned with the Nestorian movement, declared heretical in the Roman Empire.

Babai was also known as patriarch of Seleucia-Ctesiphon. When he became patriarch, he was married. With the permission of King Djamasp, Babai was allowed to call a synod (council) in 497/499, at which clerical celibacy was abolished, permitting priests and even bishops to marry. Babai died during the reign of King Kobad, during a time while Kobad was at war with the Byzantine Empire.

References

Sources

 
 
 Till Engelmann, "Monastisch geprägter Theologe oder theologisch gebildeter Mönch? Das Zentrum der Theologie Babais des Großen," in Dmitrij Bumazhnov u. Hans R. Seeliger (hg.) Syrien im 1.-7. Jahrhundert nach Christus. Akten der 1. Tübinger Tagung zum Christlichen Orient (15.-16. Juni 2007) (Tübingen, Mohr Siebeck, 2011) (Studien und Texte zu Antike und Christentum / Studies and Texts in Antiquity and Christianity, 62),
 
 
 

Patriarchs of the Church of the East
Christians in the Sasanian Empire
5th-century bishops of the Church of the East
6th-century deaths
Year of birth unknown
6th-century bishops of the Church of the East